Duke De of Qin (710–676 BC) was from 677 to 676 BC the eleventh ruler of the Zhou Dynasty state of Qin that eventually united China to become the Qin Dynasty.  His ancestral name was Ying, and Duke De was his posthumous title.

Duke De was the second of the three sons of his father Duke Xian of Qin.  His younger half-brother Chuzi was the first to succeed Duke Xian in 704 BC, but was killed six years later.  His older brother Duke Wu of Qin then ascended the throne and reigned for 20 years.  Although Duke Wu had a son named Bai (白), when he died in 678 BC it was Duke De who succeeded him, while Prince Bai was enfeoffed at the capital Pingyang.

In the first year of his reign, Duke De moved the capital to Yong (in present-day Fengxiang, Shaanxi), which would remain the capital of Qin until almost three centuries later, when Duke Xian (Shixi) moved the capital to Yueyang in 383 BC.  However, Duke De reigned for only two years before dying in 676 BC, aged 34.  He had three sons, who would in turn ascend the throne as Duke Xuan, Duke Cheng, and Duke Mu, respectively.

References

Rulers of Qin
7th-century BC Chinese monarchs
710 BC births
676 BC deaths